Tillandsia festucoides, commonly known as the fescue airplant, is a species of bromeliad that is native to the Greater Antilles, Mexico, the Cayman Islands, and Central America.

Cultivars
 Tillandsia 'Festubail' (T. festucoides × T. baileyi)

References

festucoides
Plants described in 1896
Flora of Mexico
Flora of Central America
Flora of the Caribbean
Taxa named by Adolphe-Théodore Brongniart
Taxa named by Carl Christian Mez
Flora without expected TNC conservation status